Ataxia was a short-lived American experimental rock supergroup formed in 2004 by guitarist John Frusciante (Red Hot Chili Peppers), bassist Joe Lally (Fugazi) and drummer Josh Klinghoffer (Dot Hacker, The Bicycle Thief), who later succeeded Frusciante as the lead guitarist of the Red Hot Chili Peppers until 2019, at which point Frusciante rejoined the band.

Ataxia wrote and recorded songs for two weeks, and the material was separated into two albums: Automatic Writing (2004) and AW II (2007). The songs all feature a ground-bass line with the guitar overlaying different motifs and long developments. In March 2008, Lally described the band's writing process:

Ataxia performed two shows, both at the Knitting Factory in Los Angeles, on February 2 and February 3, 2004. Following this, the group disbanded. Josh Klinghoffer continued to work with Frusciante on his solo projects and as a touring musician with the Red Hot Chili Peppers. After Frusciante's departure from the Red Hot Chili Peppers in 2009, Klinghoffer became the band's lead guitar player until December 2019, when Frusciante rejoined the group.

Band members 
John Frusciante  – electric guitar, vocals, synthesizer
Joe Lally  – bass guitar, vocals
Josh Klinghoffer  – drums, vocals, synthesizer

Discography
Automatic Writing (2004)
AW II (2007)

References

American experimental musical groups
Rock music supergroups
Musical groups established in 2004
Musical groups disestablished in 2004
Record Collection artists